Rimul or Romol is a farm in the municipality of Melhus in Trøndelag county, Norway. The farm lies near the western part of the village of Melhus. It was the scene of the murder of Håkon Sigurdsson (also known as Hákon Sigurðsson or Hákon Earl) by his slave Tormod Kark (Þormóðr Karkr), as described in the Saga of king Olav Tryggvason in Snorri Sturluson's Heimskringla.  

The farm is still in operation today, hundreds of years after the murder. There is a big stone lying nearby, thought maybe to be scene of Olaf's speech. This is, however, not proven. The events are the theme of the opera Thora paa Rimol which was composed in 1894, but not performed until 2002 in Melhus on the occasion of the village's thousandth anniversary.

History
Hákon Earl had a mistress named Thora (Þóra) at the Rimul farm. After their night in Jarlshola, Hákon and his slave went on to Rimul, seeking further shelter from Olav Tryggvason and his men, who were at that time searching for the Earl. Thora led them to a pig sty beneath a great stone. Later, after killing the Earl's son, Erlend (Erlendr) and many men of his hird, Olaf Tryggvason arrived at Rimul with a group of local farmers, now supporting him. In the Heimskringla, the story continues as follows:

Lying in the pig sty the same night, Kark killed Hákon Earl. He cut his head off and brought it to Olaf Tryggvason, expecting to collect the reward. Unfortunately, Olaf did not respect a slave murdering his own Lord. Tormod Kark was himself decapitated. Both heads were reputedly set on stakes in Munkholmen for people to spit at.

See also
 Jarlshola

References

External links
 Saga of king Olaf Tryggvason 

Historic farms in Norway
Farms in Trøndelag
Melhus